Washington-Marion Magnet High School is a magnet high school in Lake Charles, Louisiana, United States. It is a part of the Calcasieu Parish Public Schools.

 it has 699 students and 90% of the staff is certified.

Athletics
Washington-Marion Magnet High athletics competes in the LHSAA.

Notable alumni
Vincent Brisby (1989), professional football player, primarily for the New England Patriots
Josh Gray (basketball) (2011), professional basketball player for the Northern Arizona Suns (attended, transferred before graduation)
Eddie Kennison (1992), professional football player, primarily for the Kansas City Chiefs
Nate Livings (2000), professional football player for the Cincinnati Bengals and Dallas Cowboys
Brandon Winey (1996), professional football player for the Washington Redskins and New York Giants
Mark Vital (2012),Professional football player for the Kansas City Chiefs

References

External links
 Washington-Marion Magnet High School

Public high schools in Louisiana
Schools in Calcasieu Parish, Louisiana